"Lonely" is a song written by Merril Bainbridge and Owen Bolwell, produced by Siew for Bainbridge's second album, Between the Days (1998). It was released as the album's first single in Australia in April 1998 as a CD single. The bridge of the song samples the lyrics from the nursery rhyme "Georgie Porgie".

Chart performance
The song made its debut to the Australian ARIA Singles Chart at number 74, making the song Bainbridge's fifth song to reach the top 100. On its second week, it fell three places to number 77, then jumped nine places to 68 the following week. After six weeks of being in the chart, it entered the top 50 at number 48. Two weeks later, the song peaked at number 40, then dropped out of the top 50 the next week. The song spent a total of three weeks in the top 50 and 17 weeks in the top 100. According to Australian magazine The Music Network, "Lonely" was the most-aired song on Australian radio for 21 weeks. In the US, the track peaked at number 18 on the Billboard Bubbling Under Hot 100 chart, spending four weeks on the listing.

Track listing
Australian and US CD single
 "Lonely"
 "Lonely" (alternate mix)
 "Lonely" (acoustic version)

Charts

Release history

References

1998 singles
1998 songs
Merril Bainbridge songs
Songs written by Merril Bainbridge
Universal Records singles